Nepalis (English: Nepalese) are the citizens of Nepal under the provisions of Nepali nationality law. The country is home to people of many different national origins who are the descendants of immigrants from India, Kashmir, Central Asia, and Tibet.  The term Nepalis (Nepalese) usually refers to the nationality, that is, to people with citizenship of Nepal, while the people without Nepalese citizenship but with roots in Nepal such as Nepalese Americans are strictly referred  to as Nepali Speaking Foreigners who are speakers of Bhojpuri, Maithili, Nepali or any of the other 128 Nepalese languages but are now foreign citizens or of foreign nationality bearing passports and citizenship of the foreign nation. It is also not generally used to refer to non-citizen residents, dual citizens, and expatriates.

Nepal is a multicultural and multi-ethnic country with a majority of Hindus (including Kirats and Buddhists) while Muslims and Christians of Hindus origin are minorities. Kathmandu Valley, in the middle hill region and the Madhesh Province, constitutes a small fraction of the nation's area but is the most densely populated, with almost 37 percent of the Nepali's population.

Names
The name Nepalese has been recorded in usage of English language, however is rejected as an Anglicization. The term Nepa-mi (Nepal Bhasa : 𑐣𑐾𑐥𑐵𑑅𑐩𑐶, नेपाःमि) is used among the Newars.

History

The Gopala and Mahishpala dynasty has been recorded as earliest instance of Nepali people.

Ethnic groups
The population ranking of 125 Nepali castes/ethnic groups as per the 2011 Nepal census.

Nepali diaspora

The Nepali diaspora or Non Resident Nepali are Nepali people living overseas. The Non-resident Nepali Act, 2064 of Nepal defines a non-resident Nepali as someone who is a foreign citizen of Nepalese origin including a Nepalese citizen residing abroad.

Province division of Nepal 
Source article: Administrative divisions Of Nepal

Notes:

 There are total of 77 districts in Nepal
 Province No. 1 have maximum number of districts(i.e. 14) and province number 7 has the minimum number of districts
 Province number 6 has got the greater land area coverage

See also

 Nepal
 Languages of Nepal
 List of Nepali people
 Music of Nepal
 Religion in Nepal
 Demographics of Nepal

References

 
Demographics of Nepal
Ethnic groups in Nepal
Ethnic groups in South Asia
Linguistic groups of the constitutionally recognised official languages of India